Optical Waves in Layered Media is written as a textbook by Pochi Yeh for current optics courses in electrical engineering or applied physics. The book focuses on physics theory more than practical application. It is clearly written and includes comprehensive mathematical theoretical representations of the topics covered. General topical coverage is divided into five parts beginning with electromagnetic theory. It then covers isotropic layered thin films, anisotropic and inhomogeneous media including crystals and birefringence, and guided waves using layered media. 
Currently, with more than 2,750 citations, this book is highly cited. The book was first published by John Wiley & Sons in 1988 and has been reprinted several times, with the last reprint in 2005.

Author
In 1971, Pochi Yeh received his PhD in physics from the California Institute of Technology. He then obtained a position at Rockwell International Science Center in Thousand Oaks, California. In 1989 he became a member of the faculty at UC Santa Barbara. He is also the author and co-author of three other published books in the Optics discipline.

References

External links
 
 Table of contents. PDF format. John Wiley & Sons
 Pochi Yeh. Microsoft Academic Search. (2012).

Physics textbooks
Engineering textbooks
Wiley (publisher) books